Jatra may refer to:
 Jatra (theatre), a folk-theatre form of Bengali theatre
 Jatra (2016 film), 2016 Nepalese movie
 Jatra (Maharashtra), village festivals in the state of Maharashtra, India
 Jatra (Nepal), a street festival by the Newars
 Jatra (Odisha), an Odia theater performance in Odisha, India
 Yatra and Zatra, two Hindu pilgrimage festivals
 Jatra: Hyalagaad Re Tyalagaad, a 2006 Indian Marathi-language comedy film

See also
 Yatra (disambiguation)
 Ratha Yatra